Legio VI Victrix ("Victorious Sixth Legion") was a legion of the Imperial Roman army founded in 41 BC by the general Octavian (who, as Augustus, later became Rome's first emperor). It was the twin legion of VI Ferrata and perhaps held veterans of that legion, and some soldiers kept to the traditions of the Caesarian legion.

In Republican Service
The legion saw its first action in Perusia in 41 BC. It also served against the Sextus Pompeius, who occupied Sicily and made threats to discontinue sending grain to Rome. In 31 BC the legion fought in the Battle of Actium against Mark Antony.

In Imperial Service

VI Victrix in Spain
The legion took part in the final stage of the Roman conquest of Hispania, participating in Augustus' major war against the Cantabrians, from 29 BC to 19 BC, that brought all of the Iberian Peninsula under Roman rule.

The legion stayed in Spain for nearly a century and received the surname Hispaniensis, founding the city of Legio (modern-day León). Soldiers of this unit and X Gemina numbered among the first settlers of Caesaraugusta, what became modern-day Zaragoza. The cognomen Victrix (Victorious) dates back to the reign of Nero. But Nero was unpopular in the area, and when the governor of Hispania Tarraconensis, Galba, said he wished to overthrow Nero, the legion supported him and he was proclaimed Emperor in the VI Victrix legionary camp. Galba created VII Gemina and marched on Rome, where Nero killed himself.

VI Victrix in Germany
For a brief period (approximately 110 AD to 119), the legion was stationed along the Rhine river in the province of Germania Inferior.

VI Victrix in Britain

In 119, Hadrian relocated the legion to northern Britannia, to assist those legions already present in quelling the resistance there. Victrix was key in securing victory, and would eventually replace the diminished IX Hispana at Eboracum. In 122 the legion started work on Hadrian's Wall which would sustain the peace for two decades.

Twenty years later, they helped construct the Antonine Wall and its forts such as Castlecary but it was largely abandoned by 164. In 2020 a replica of the Eastermains stone was installed in Twechar. The original was found on Eastermains Farm (which adjoins Whitehill), west of Inchbelly Bridge, east of Kirkintilloch and is often associated with Auchendavy. It has been scanned and a video produced. It is similar to two other distance slabs of the Sixth Legion on the Antonine Wall.

In 175, the Roman emperor, Marcus Aurelius, defeated the Iazyges tribe of Sarmatians. He took them into Roman service and settled 5,500 of them in Britain; it has been claimed without evidence and contrary to legionary recruitment practices that some were assigned to Legio VI Victrix based in York. The only detachment attested in Britain is a unit at Ribchester, south of Lancaster. Less certain is evidence from Bainesse, near Catterick, where lost tiles apparently stamped BSAR may be evidence for the presence of a Sarmatian unit there.

Legio VI was awarded the honorary title "Britannica" by Commodus in AD 184 following his own adoption of the title. 

In 185, the British legions mutinied and put forward one legate Priscus, a commander of their own (about whom little other information is known, but possibly Caerellius Priscus), to replace the unpopular Emperor Commodus, but the former declined. The mutiny was suppressed by Pertinax, who would later become emperor himself after Commodus was murdered.

The large fort at Carpow in Scotland was occupied from about 184 by Legio VI who completed the fort with the principia and praetorium which they roofed with tiles bearing their new cognomen.

The Legate of the legion in the late second century, Claudius Hieronymianus, dedicated a temple to Serapis in Eboracum in advance of the arrival of Septimius Severus in AD208.

An altar to Hercules was dedicated by Gaius Vitellius Atticianus, Centurion of the Legio VI Victrix, at Whitley Castle (Epiacum), illustrated above left.

Attested members

Epigraphic inscriptions
- Dis Manibus Gai Iuli Galeria tribu Caleni Lugduno veterani ex legione VI Victrice Pia Fideli heres a se memoriae fecit. Lincoln (Lindum), U.K. RIB 252 = CIL VII 182.
- Dis Manibus sacrum Nig̣ṛiṇae vixit annos XXXX Aurelius Casitto legionis VI Victricis Piae Fidelis curavit. Great Chesters (Aesica), U.K. RIB 1746 = CIL VII 740.
- Dis Manibus Titi Flavi Flavini legionis VI Victricis Classicius Aprilis heres prius quam obiret fieri iussit. York (Eboracum), U.K. RIB 675.
- Dis Manibus Lucius Bebius Augusta (tribu) Crescens Vindelicum miles legionis VI Victricis Piae Fidelis annorum XLIII stipendiorum XXIII heres amico faciendum curavit. York (Eboracum), U.K. RIB 671.
- Dis Manibus Flaviae Augustinae vixit annos XXXVIIII menses VII dies XI filius Saenius Augustinus vixit annum I dies III vixit annum I menses VIIII dies V Gaius Aeresius Saenus veteranus legionis VI Victricis coniugi carissimae et sibi faciendum curavit. York (Eboracum), U.K. RIB 685 = CIL VII 245.
- Dis Manibus Gaius Iulius Gai filius colonia Flavia Ingenuus miles legionis VI Victricis Piae Fidelis. High Rochester (Bremenium), U.K. RIB 1292 = CIL VII 1057.
- Dis Manibus Flavius Agricola miles legionis VI Victricis vixit annos XLII dies X Albia Faustina coniugi inconparabili faciendum curavit. London (Londinium), U.K. CIL V 25.
-Lucio Pompeio Luci filio / Quirina (tribu) Faventino / praefecto cohortis VI Asturum / tribuno militum legionis VI Victricis (...). Astorga (Asturica), Spain.  CIL II 2637 = AE 1966, 187.
- Lucius Valerius Silvanus / miles legionis VI Victricis / Deo Turiaco / votum solvit libens merito. Porto (Portus), Portugal. CIL II 2374 = AE 1959, 103. ·
- Titus Pompeius Titi filius / Tromentina (tribu) / Albinus' domo Vienna / IIvir tribunus militum legionis VI Victricis. Mérida (Emerita Augusta), Spain. AE 2002, 929.
- Dis Manibus sacrum Gaius Iulius Severus veteranus legionis VI Victricis annorum LXI Iulia Danae liberta ex testamento (...).Mérida (Emerita Augusta), Spain. CIL II 490.
- Marcus Tavonius / Marci filius / Romilia (tribu) / Firmus domo Ateste / miles legionis VI Victricis (...). Mérida, Spain. Museo Nacional de Arte Romano - Mérida.
- Dis Manibus sacrum / Gaius Iulius Severus / veteranus legionis VI Victricis / annorum LXI / Iulia Danae liberta ex testamento (...). Mérida, Spain.  CIL II 490.
- Dis Manibus sacrum Lucius Maelonius Aper veteranus legionis VI Victricis  (...).  Mérida, Spain.  CIL II 491.
- Dis Manibus sacrum / Lucius Maelonius Aper / veteranus legionis VI Victricis  (...). Mérida, Spain. CIL II 491.
- Legio VI victrix. Moers, Nordrhein-Westfalen. AE 2005, 1069b.
- Lucius Helvius Luci filius / Papiria tribu / Rebilus Augustanus / veteranus legionis VI Victricis. Mérida, Spain. AE 2006, 616.

In popular culture
The legion is mentioned in Robert Heinlein's novel Have Space Suit – Will Travel and in the book From Scythia to Camelot by C. Scott Littleton and Linda A. Malcor.

Reenactment  
A modern reenactment group based in Los Angeles reenacts this legion.

Another one exists based in Denmark and Sweden found under the name Legionord

Legio VI Victrix, Eboracum reenacts this legion in York.

The Antonine Guard, a living history society based in Scotland, recreates a unit of Legio VI during the Antonine occupation of Caledonia in the 2nd century AD.

See also 
 List of Roman legions

References

External links 

 livius.org account
 Legion Six Victorious, Los Angeles Roman reenactment society
 LEG VI VIC COH VI ASTVR, German re-enactment society
  The Antonine Guard, Scottish re-enactment society
 History Files: Alans (Geloni)
 From Scythia to Camelot By C. Scott Littleton and Linda A. Malcor

06 Victrix
6 Victrix
40s BC establishments
41 BC
Military units and formations established in the 1st century BC